Flóra Varjas-Sipeki (born 4 April 1991 in Budapest) is a Hungarian handball goalkeeper who plays for Moyra-Budaörs Handball.

Sipeki previously played for Váci NKSE, Békéscsabai Előre NKSE and Szombathelyi KKA, and with Vác she won the bronze medal of the Hungarian Championship in 2010. Flóra had a key role in the success, as she saved two decisive penalties in the shootout in the bronze final against her next club Békéscsaba.

Achievements
Nemzeti Bajnokság I:
Bronze Medalist: 2010
Magyar Kupa:
Silver Medalist: 2012

References

External links
 Flóra Sipeki career statistics at Worldhandball

1991 births
Living people
Handball players from Budapest
Hungarian female handball players
Békéscsabai Előre NKSE players
20th-century Hungarian women
21st-century Hungarian women